Görkem Polat is a Turkish taekwondo athlete.

Career 
In 2022, Görkem Polat won the silver medals in 54 kg at the 2022 European Taekwondo Championships held in Manchester, England.He clinched one of bronze medal at the 2022 World Taekwondo Grand Prix in Rome during the men's 58 kg event.

References 

Living people
Turkish male taekwondo practitioners
European Taekwondo Championships medalists
Year of birth missing (living people)
21st-century Turkish people
Islamic Solidarity Games medalists in taekwondo
Islamic Solidarity Games competitors for Turkey